Grammothele hainanensis is a poroid crust fungi in the family Polyporaceae. Described as a new species in 2016, it is named for Hainan, the type locality. It has 
cylindrical spores that have dimensions of 7–8.1 by 2.3–2.9 μm.

References

hainanensis
Fungi described in 2016
Fungi of China